Scaphoideus titanus, or the American grapevine leafhopper, is an insect of the leafhopper family (Cicadellidae) which feeds on various plants of the family Vitaceae. Native to North America, it was introduced by accident to Europe where it has become a pest by acting as a vector of the grapevine phytoplasma disease flavescence dorée.

References 

Insect vectors of plant pathogens
Insects described in 1932
Hemiptera of North America
Scaphoideini